The 2020–21 Grand Canyon Antelopes men's basketball team represented Grand Canyon University during the 2020–21 NCAA Division I men's basketball season. They are led by head coach Bryce Drew in his first season. The Antelopes play their home games at GCU Arena in Phoenix, Arizona as members of the Western Athletic Conference.  They finished the season 17-7, 9-3 in WAC Play to finish a tie for the regular season championship. They defeated Seattle and New Mexico State to win the WAC tournament. They received the conference’s automatic bid to the NCAA tournament where they lost in the first round to Iowa.

Previous season 
The Antelopes finished the 2019–20 season 13–17, 8–8 in WAC play to finish in a tie for fifth place. They were set to be the No. 4 seed in the WAC tournament, however the tournament was canceled amid concerns over the COVID-19 pandemic.

On March 13, 2020, the school fired Dan Majerle as head coach of the Antelopes. A few days later, the school named former Vanderbilt and Valparaiso head coach Bryce Drew as the Antelopes' next head coach.

Roster

Schedule and results

|-
!colspan=12 style=| Non-conference regular season

|-
!colspan=12 style=| WAC Regular Season

|-
!colspan=12 style=| WAC tournament

|-
!colspan=12 style=| NCAA tournament

Source

References

Grand Canyon Antelopes men's basketball seasons
Grand Canyon
Grand Canyon Antelopes men's basketball
Grand Canyon Antelopes men's basketball
Grand Canyon